Nolan Allan (born April 28, 2003) is a Canadian junior ice hockey defenceman for the Seattle Thunderbirds of the Western Hockey League (WHL) as a prospect to the Chicago Blackhawks of the National Hockey League (NHL).  Allan was drafted in the first round, 32nd overall, by the Blackhawks in the 2021 NHL Entry Draft.

Playing career

Junior
In the 2018 WHL Bantam Draft, the Prince Albert Raiders selected Allan in the first round, third overall.  In the 2021 NHL Entry Draft, he was selected in first round, 32nd overall by the Chicago Blackhawks. He was later signed by the Blackhawks to a three-year, entry-level contract on September 17, 2021. 

Prior to the 2022–23 season, on October 4, 2022, he was named captain of the Raiders alongside Landon Kosior, Evan Herman, Carson Latimer who were named assistants.  On November 16, 2022, Allan along with Reese Shaw were traded to the Seattle Thunderbirds for Easton Kovacs, Braydon Dube, Gabe Ludwidg, and six draft selections including two first rounds selections in 2023 and 2024.

International play

On December 12, 2022, Allan was named to Team Canada to compete at the 2023 World Junior Ice Hockey Championships. During the tournament he recorded one goal and one assist in seven games and won a gold medal.

Career statistics

Regular season and playoffs

International

References

External links

2003 births
Living people
Canadian ice hockey centres
Chicago Blackhawks draft picks
National Hockey League first-round draft picks
Prince Albert Raiders players
People from Davidson, Saskatchewan
Seattle Thunderbirds players